Stubborn means having or showing dogged determination not to change one's attitude or position on something.

Stubborn may also refer to:

 , a Second World War Royal Navy submarine
 Little Miss Stubborn, a character in the Little Miss series of books
 Mr. Stubborn, a character on the children's television show The Mr. Men Show
 Stubborn Love, 2012 song

See also 
 List of people known as the Stubborn
 Citrus stubborn disease, a plant disease affecting species in the genus Citrus